Darrell Wayne Lukas (born September 2, 1935 in Antigo, Wisconsin) is an American horse trainer and a U.S. Racing Hall of Fame inductee. He has won twenty Breeders' Cup races, received five Eclipse Awards for his accomplishments, and his horses have won 25 year-end Eclipse Awards. He was inducted into the American Quarter Horse Hall of Fame in 2007.

Background and career
Born and raised on a small farm, Lukas grew up with an interest in horses. He graduated from the University of Wisconsin–Madison with a master's degree in education then taught high school where he was a head basketball coach. He was initiated into the Kappa Sigma fraternity while an undergraduate.  He began training quarter horses in California in 1968 and after 10 years of achievement that saw him train 24 world champions, he switched to training thoroughbreds. The first trainer to earn more than $100 million in purse money, he has been the year's top money winner 14 times. Lukas got his big break in 1980 when he won the Preakness Stakes on Codex. His horses have won the Kentucky Derby four times, the Preakness Stakes on six occasions, and have claimed victory four times in the Belmont Stakes, including winning all three of the Classics in 1995 with Thunder Gulch (Kentucky Derby, Belmont Stakes) and Timber Country (Preakness), making him the first trainer to sweep the Triple Crown Classic races with two different horses in a season. In 2013, he surpassed Sunny Jim Fitzsimmons for the most Triple Crown race victories, with 14.

He has won Breeder's Cup races a record 20 times. Fillies Lukas has trained have won the Kentucky Oaks four times. Three of his horses—Lady's Secret in 1986, Criminal Type in 1990 and Charismatic in 1999—won the Eclipse Award for Horse of the Year.  He has a total of 25 horses that have won various Eclipse Awards. He has won the Eclipse Award for Outstanding Trainer four times. In 1999, the same year his horse Charismatic came within 2 lengths of the Triple Crown, he was inducted into the National Museum of Racing and Hall of Fame. He was inducted into the American Quarter Horse Hall of Fame in 2007, becoming the first person to enter both the Thoroughbred and Quarter Horse halls of fame.  In 2013 he was awarded the Eclipse Award of Merit for his accomplishments. In 1988, Lukas received the Golden Plate Award of the American Academy of Achievement presented by Awards Council member Gene Klein.

In 2014, at age 78, in his acceptance speech for the 2013 Eclipse Award of Merit, he stated, "[w]hen they start giving you awards...they are trying to get you to retire. Well, you young trainers get ready because I'm not retiring. We're coming after you, so you'd better get up a little more early in the morning from now on. We're coming after you with a vengeance."

Personal life
Lukas has been married four times.  He had one son, Jeff (1957–2016), and two grandchildren, with his first wife.  In December 1993, Lukas' derby contender Tabasco Cat seriously injured Jeff Lukas, who worked for his father as an assistant trainer and was the elder Lukas' hard-driving right-hand man. In a shedrow accident at Santa Anita Park, the colt broke loose and when Jeff Lukas tried to stop him, the horse slammed into him, throwing him into the air and when Jeff landed on the concrete, he suffered a skull fracture which left him in a coma for several weeks. He suffered permanent brain damage; he had changes in personality, vision loss, and damage to his memory.  By spring of 1994, he had recovered enough that he attempted to return to horse racing, but after a series of less-demanding jobs ending in 2003, it was clear he could not work safely around racehorses.  He also tried living and working near horse farms, but his disabilities were too severe for him to be safe around horses at all.  He ultimately moved to Atoka, Oklahoma, in 2007 to work for David Burrage, who had been the accountant and general manager for Lukas Racing Stables.  By that time, Burrage was a banker and owned the First Bank in Atoka, which employed Lukas.  His father bought him a home there and Jeff lived a quiet life until his death at age 58 in March 2016.

Lukas suffered with COVID-19 in 2020. However, he later recovered from the illness

Thoroughbreds trained with major wins
Kentucky Derby
Winning Colors (1988)
Thunder Gulch (1995)
Grindstone (1996)
Charismatic (1999)

Preakness Stakes
Codex (1980)
Tank's Prospect (1985)
Tabasco Cat (1994)
Timber Country (1995)
Charismatic (1999)
Oxbow (2013)

Belmont Stakes
Tabasco Cat (1994)
Thunder Gulch (1995)
Editor's Note (1996)
Commendable (2000)

Breeders' Cup Classic
Cat Thief (1999)

Breeders' Cup Ladies' Classic
Life's Magic (1985)
Lady's Secret (1986)
Sacahuista (1987)
Spain (2000)

Breeders' Cup Mile
Steinlen (1989)

Breeders' Cup Sprint
Gulch (1988)
Orientate (2002)

Breeders' Cup Juvenile
Capote (1986)
Success Express (1987)
Is It True (1988)
Timber Country (1994)
Boston Harbor (1996)

Breeders' Cup Juvenile Fillies
Twilight Ridge (1985)
Open Mind (1988)
Flanders (1994)
Cash Run (1999)
Folklore (2005)
Take Charge Brandi (2014)

Breeders' Cup Juvenile Sprint
Hightail (2012)

References

Further reading
DeVito, Carlo. D. Wayne : The High-Rolling and Fast Times of America's Premier Horse Trainer (2002) McGraw-Hill

External links
D. Wayne Lukas at the United States National Museum of Racing and Hall of Fame
D. Wayne Lukas AQHA Hall of Fame
D. Wayne Lukas at the NTRA

1935 births
Living people
People from Antigo, Wisconsin
University of Wisconsin–Madison School of Education alumni
American horse trainers
Eclipse Award winners
United States Thoroughbred Racing Hall of Fame inductees
AQHA Hall of Fame (members)